The Mansebo (1906-1907) was a Korean language newspaper in Seoul founded by the Cheondogyo leader Son Byeong-hui (孫秉熙). It was published for only one year between June 1906 and June 1907. The newspaper was eventually taken over by the pro-Japanese figure Yi In-jik 李人稙 (1892-1916) and changed its name to the Daehan Sinmun 大韓新聞.

Korean-language newspapers
Publications established in 1906
Publications disestablished in 1907
1906 establishments in Korea